Ice MC (born Ian Campbell, 22 March 1965) is a British rapper who started his professional music career in Italy, when he got a record deal signing to record producer and singer Savage (Roberto Zanetti, a.k.a. Robyx) and released his debut single "Easy" in 1989. He's best known for the Eurodance 1990s hit singles "Take Away the Colour", "Think About the Way" and "It's a Rainy Day". Ice MC singles are most notable for being the first Eurodance songs to blend raggamuffin rapping style with female singing choruses. Zanetti's music team produced Ice MC hits while also producing songs for other major Italian artists of the same decade, like Double You, Alexia, and Corona.

Career

The first albums

In 1989 in Italy, Ice MC met singer and artist Roberto Zanetti (also as composer known as Savage and producer as Robyx). Their first single called "Easy", made in a hip house style, came out in 1989. It became successful all over Europe, reaching the top 5 in Italy and the top 3 in Germany. The two next singles, "Cinema" and "Scream", and the subsequent debut album, Cinema (released later in 1990), were also successful. In 1992 his second LP, My World, came out but failed to achieve the success of its predecessor.

The most successful hits
His third album, Ice'n'Green, was released in 1994 and featured Alexia on vocals. Three of his most successful songs, "Think about the Way", "It's a Rainy Day" and "Take Away the Colour", made the charts all over the world. For the third album Ice MC adopted an all new dreadlocks look and utilised Jamaican style rap, known as raggamuffin. The album was also released in the US, where the two biggest singles saw substantial club play and moderate dance music radio airplay. In 1995, Ice'n'Green – The Remix Album was released. This contained various remixes of previous hit singles.

Collaboration with Masterboy
In 1996, Ice MC decided to leave Zanetti and Alexia due to some disagreements. Shortly after that a new album, Dreadatour, (produced by Masterboy producer Enrico Zabler) was released. The hit from the album was "Give Me the Light", the second Single-Release from "Dreadatour" was "Music For Money"  also produced by Enrico Zabler from Masterboy also the Album-Tracks "Never Stop Believing" and "It's Up To You". The Album "Dreadatour" itself was not a commercial success.

Since 2002

At the end of 2002, he decided to return to Italy and to contact Roberto Zanetti again. Together they started writing some new material and, at the beginning of 2004, they began recording a new album, Cold Skool.

In 2012 a new single "Out Tonight" featuring Giulia Gal was released and in 2013 the new remixes by Enfortro & Dirty Disciples were released. 

In 2017, the single featuring Nico Heinz and Max Kuhn including an official video were released.

Discography

Studio albums

Singles

Other singles:

1997: "Bebop the Night" (original soundtrack "Wilde Zeiten")

1997: "Energy" (original soundtrack "Wilde Zeiten")

1998: "Busy Body" (unreleased single produced by Gary Jones, one of the co-producers of E-Rotic)

2013: "Out Tonight (Enfortro vs. Dirty Principle Edit)"

2017: "Do the Dip" (feat. Nico Heinz & Max Kuhn)

References

External links
 Booking website

1965 births
English people of Jamaican descent
Black British male rappers
English male rappers
Club DJs
Eurodance musicians
Hip house musicians
People from Nottingham
Living people